Ronald J. Slenzak (born January 29, 1948) is an American photographer, best known for photographing record album covers. Some of the album covers that he has photographed include Spitfire (Jefferson Starship), Huey Lewis and the News (their self-titled debut album), It Must Be Magic (Teena Marie), Dreams (Grace Slick), Throwin' Down (Rick James) and Beat Street (Prism).

Biography
Slenzak was born on January 29, 1948.

In the 1970s, he became one of the most sought after photographers of album covers. Throughout a career that spans nearly four decades, Slenzak has photographed album covers for a wide range of recording acts including Huey Lewis and the News, Jefferson Starship and numerous Motown artists.

Other clients include: Disney, Fox Family Channel, Paramount Pictures, Sony Entertainment, Twentieth Century-Fox and Warner Brothers Television.

Currently, Slenzak is based in Venice, California. He is a member of the faculty at Art Center College of Design in Pasadena, California.

Selected Album Cover credits

References

External links

1948 births
Living people
American portrait photographers
Art Center College of Design alumni